The Skyline SL-122 Bdzhilka (bee) is a twin engine agricultural spray aircraft designed and built in Ukraine and first flown in 2010.

Design and development
The SL-122 is designed for crop spraying.  It is a high-wing monoplane with an unswept, constant chord wing with square wing tips braced with a single strut to the lower fuselage on each side.  The wing has flaps and automatic slats for low speed flight. Two  Rotax 912 ULS2 liquid cooled flat four engines are mounted over and ahead of the wing leading edge, as close together as the disks of the three blade propellers allow.

The fuselage of the SL-122 is flat sided and deep.  There are two tandem seats in the underwing cabin, which is fully glazed all around.  Its rectangular tailplane is mounted on top of the fuselage, below a straight tapered fin and rudder.  The Pchelka has a fixed, conventional undercarriage; V-struts hinged to the lower fuselage support the mainwheels at the outer ends of bungee cord sprung half axles from the fuselage underside. There is a cantilever, steerable tailwheel.

The SL-122 has a 250 L (55 Imp gal; 66 US gal) tank for agricultural spray liquid and can treat 200 ha (494 acres) per hour in 37 m (121 ft) swathes.

It first flew in May 2010 and made its public debut a month later in Zhytomyr.

Operational history
No sales were reported by 2012, though the prototype had been put on the market.

Variants
SL-122 Agricultural aircraft.
SL-124 Projected four seat transport, unflown late 2012.
SL-125 Projected amphibious variant, unflown late 2012.

Specifications (SL-122)

References

Agricultural aircraft
2010s Ukrainian civil utility aircraft
SL-122 Pchelka
High-wing aircraft
Aircraft first flown in 2010
Twin-engined tractor aircraft